The Merritt Island Causeway, mostly in Merritt Island, connects Cocoa, Merritt Island, Florida, and  Cocoa Beach, Florida.  The causeway transits the Willard Peebles bridge over the Banana River Lagoon. In the 1960s, SR A1A was routed over the eastern causeway from present day SR 520 and SR A1A, to the present day intersection of SR 520 and SR 3 on Merritt Island. The eastern section is known as the Cocoa Beach Causeway.

First route
On May 1, 1917, the first, wooden, bridge opened between Cocoa, Florida, and Merritt Island, Florida, across the Indian River. Soon after this bridge was built, two ideas for a new bridge connecting Merritt Island and Cocoa Beach over the Banana River began circulating.

 One route  Cross over Sykes Creek and east to Cocoa Beach
 The other route Cross from Horti Point east to Cocoa Beach.

On September 27, 1919, the first route was approved.  The bridge was completed April 19, 1922, after running into financial problems and costing an additional $200,000.

The present day alignment, from west to east, based upon this description 
 East Merritt Island Avenue
 Audubon Road
 Old Audubon Road
 Triangle Road
 North Banana River Drive
 Milford Point Drive (formerly part of North Banana River Drive)
 South Banana River Drive (follow south to the start of the bridge)

The narrow lane draw bridge crossed the Banana River near Old Causeway Road on Horti Point.  The present day Minuteman Causeway Boulevard in Cocoa Beach, and Old Causeway Road in Angel City are the remaining ends of the Merritt Island Causeway. The bridge system composed of the Indian River Bridge and the Banana River Bridge lasted another 18 years, when growth caught up with the bridge system.

Second route

On June 5, 1941, the present day alignment of SR 520 opened with a single wider lane in each direction.  Two draw bridges, one on each river, and a few relief bridges made up the causeway.  The original wooden bridges were torn up shortly afterwards.  Today, the name Banana River Bridge refers to the eastern causeway of the Emory L. Bennett Causeway, a part of SR 528.

Traffic problems were growing worse in the 1960s, and the county appealed to then Vice President Hubert H. Humphrey for relief. Vice President spoke to NASA and the U.S. Air Force and they agreed to help fund the widening.  On August 16, 1962, the road widening was completed.  Less than six years later the Hubert H. Humphrey Bridge was dedicated by Hubert H. Humphrey on March 1, 1968.

At nearly the same time there were proposals for additional bridges in the area. Cocoa Avenue (now Minuteman Causeway) was proposed to cross to Merritt Island over the Minuteman Causeway.  Its route would have taken it along the old Banana River Bridge.  The idea was formally denied on February 26, 1970, by the State of Florida.

Widening projects continue, and the eastern draw bridge has been removed from the causeway.

References
 Brevard Property Appraiser Plat Book 3, Page 11
 Brevard Property Appraiser Plat Book 16, Page 142
 Brevard Property Appraiser Plat Book 21, Page 9
 The City of Cocoa Beach : The First Sixty Years.  Glenn Rabac. Apollo Books. 1986 (Majority of facts from here)
 Kennedy Space Center History - Chapter 18
 Cocoa Village important dates in Cocoa History
 See the Talk:SR A1A article on references for SR A1A alignment
 Cocoa Beach Resolution 65-8

Causeways in Florida
Bridges over the Banana River
Bridges over the Indian River (Florida)
Indian River Lagoon
Bridges in Brevard County, Florida
Road bridges in Florida